The 2006–07 Polska Liga Hokejowa season was the 72nd season of the Polska Liga Hokejowa, the top level of ice hockey in Poland. 10 teams participated in the league, and Podhale Nowy Targ won the championship.

First round

Final round

Qualification round

Playoffs

Relegation 
 KTH Krynica - KH Sanok 1:4 (4:5 SO, 0:5, 3:5, 3:1, 1:3)

External links
 Season on hockeyarchives.info

Polska Hokej Liga seasons
Polska
Polska